Eddie Beal (June 13, 1910, Redlands, California – December 15, 1984, Los Angeles) was an American jazz pianist. He was the brother of Charlie Beal.

Beal started on drums but switched to piano in his teens. Early in the 1930s he worked in the orchestras of Earl Dancer and Charlie Echols. From 1933 to 1936 he toured China with Buck Clayton, then freelanced in California (with Maxine Sullivan, among others) until 1941. After military service from 1943–45, he accompanied Ivie Anderson, and led his own trio which accompanied Billie Holiday at one point. He also worked in the Spirits of Rhythm.  As a composer, he penned the tunes "Softly" (covered by Holliday) and "Bye and Bye", a hit for The Turbans. He plays on the soundtrack to the 1951 film The Strip; he also makes an appearance in the film. Later recording credits include work with Jimmy Mundy, Herb Jeffries, Helen Humes, Red Callender, and others. He led his own group in Las Vegas, Nevada in 1973-74, and in 1974-75 he played with Tommy Dorsey.

Discography
Track Performances
 Married Man Blues (1946) By Helen Humes And All Stars
 Lost Love (1951) by Percy Mayfield And Orchestra
 Swingin' Suite (1956) By Red Callender And His Modern Octet
 The Lowest (1958) By Red Callender
 The Rising Surf (1963) By Richie Allen (AKA Richard Allen) And The Pacific Surfers
 The Hunt Is On (1982) By Percy Mayfield With Monroe Tucker & His Orchestra
 Hopeless (1982) By Percy Mayfield With Monroe Tucker & His Orchestra
 Two Hearts Are Greater Than One (1982) By Percy Mayfield With Monroe Tucker & His Orchestra
 Candy Store Blues (1988) By Toni Harper
 Sam's Song (The Happy Tune) (1988) By Toni Harper
 Happy Feet (1988) By Toni Harper
 The Dish Rag (Rub A Dub Dub) (1988) By Toni Harper
 Get Up (1988) By Toni Harper
 Dolly's Lullaby (1988) By Toni Harper
 I Dream Of Jeanie With The Light Brown Hair (1998) By Maxine Sullivan
 I'm Happy About The Whole Thing (1998) By Maxine Sullivan
 Surfers' Slide (2006) By Richie Allen And The Pacific Surfers
 If I Had You By Flora Washington With Eddie Beal Trio
 What Will I Tell My Heart By Flora Washington With Eddie Beal Trio
Writing and Compositions
 Sweet Riley O'Toole (1954) By Ken Hanna And His Orchestra
 Move On (1957) By The Blossoms
 Young Heartaches (1958) By Ben Joe Zeppa
 Who Slammed The Door (1958) By Little Caesar With Eddie Beal And His Orchestra
 I'm Reachin' (1958) By Little Caesar With Eddie Beal And His Orchestra
 Let's Close The Door (1964) By Georgia Carr
 Softly (1964) By Georgia Carr
 Once To Ev'ry Girl (1964) By Georgia Carr
 Skoot (1972) By Stan Kenton And His Orchestra 
 Candy Store Blues (1988) By Toni Harper
 You're Too Tall, I'm Too Small (1988) By Toni Harper
 All Because Of You (1989) By Dinah Washington
 Softly (Baby) (1989) By Dinah Washington
 Softly (1990) By Billie Holiday
 Bye and Bye (1992) By The Turbans
Arrangements
 When Does Friendship End And True Love Start (1962) By Debbie Stuart
 Does Your Heart Beat For Me (1962) By Debbie Stuart

References

Eugene Chadbourne, [ Eddie Beal] at Allmusic
"Eddie Beal". Grove Jazz online.

1910 births
1984 deaths
American jazz pianists
American male pianists
Jazz musicians from California
20th-century American pianists
20th-century American male musicians
American male jazz musicians